Myrmecia dispar is an Australian ant which belongs to the genus Myrmecia. This species is native to Australia. They are distributed nationwide, and the species was first described by John S. Clark in 1951.

The average size of a typical worker ant is 9.5-11 millimetres, making the Myrmecia dispar among the smallest species of bull ant. The head and gaster are of a chocolate brown colour, thorax, node, and the legs are reddish-brown, and the mandibles and tarsi are a reddish-yellow colour.

References

Myrmeciinae
Hymenoptera of Australia
Insects described in 1951
Insects of Australia